Daniel Ioniță may refer to:

Daniel Ioniță (ambassador), Romanian ambassador to the Republic of Moldova
Daniel Ioniță (poet), an Australian-Romanian poet